Lapeirousia arenicola is a species of flowering plant in the genus Lapeirousia. It is endemic to the Northern Cape and Western Cape of South Africa.

Conservation status 
Lapeirousia arenicola is classified as Least Concern as the population trend is stable.

References

External links 
 
 

Endemic flora of South Africa
Flora of South Africa
Flora of the Cape Provinces
Iridaceae